Sissel Løchen (born 17 June 1969) is a Norwegian wheelchair curling player and psychiatric nurse.

Early life
Løchen was born on 17 June 1969 in Bryne, Norway.

Career
She participated at the 2014 Winter Paralympics and won a silver medal at the 2018 Winter Paralympics.

Løchen participated in both the 2012 World Wheelchair Curling Championship and the 2013 World Wheelchair Curling Championship for Norway.

References

External links

1969 births
Living people
People from Bryne
Norwegian female curlers
Norwegian wheelchair curlers
Paralympic wheelchair curlers of Norway
Wheelchair curlers at the 2014 Winter Paralympics
Wheelchair curlers at the 2018 Winter Paralympics
Wheelchair curlers at the 2022 Winter Paralympics
Paralympic medalists in wheelchair curling
Paralympic silver medalists for Norway
Medalists at the 2018 Winter Paralympics
Sportspeople from Rogaland